Boone may refer to:

People 
 Boone (surname)
 Boone Carlyle, a character from the Lost TV series
 Boone Helm (1828–1864), an American mountain man, gunfighter, and serial killer known as the Kentucky Cannibal
 Boone Jenner, an ice hockey forward
 Boone Logan, a baseball pitcher

Places in the United States
 Boone, Colorado
 Boone, Iowa
 Boone, Missouri
 Boone, Nebraska
 Boone, North Carolina
 Boone, Tennessee
 Boone, West Virginia
 Boone Grove, Indiana
 Boone Township (disambiguation)
 Boones Mill, Virginia
 Boonesboro, Missouri
 Boonesborough, Kentucky
 Booneville (disambiguation)
 Boone County (disambiguation)
 Boone River, Iowa

Ships 
 USS Boone (FFG-28)
 USS Boone County (LST-389)
 USS Daniel Boone (SSBN-629)

Schools 
 Boone County High School, Florence, Kentucky
 Daniel Boone High School (disambiguation)
 William R. Boone High School, Orlando, Florida

Other 
 MiniBooNE, a physics experiment at Fermilab to detect neutrinos.
 Boone Hall, a southern plantation in Mount Pleasant, South Carolina
 Daniel Boone (TV series), a 1964–1970 NBC television series starring Fess Parker
 Boone, a 1983–1984 NBC television series starring Tom Byrd
 Denver Boone, or Boone the Pioneer, mascot of the University of Denver from 1968 to 1998

See also 
 Boon (disambiguation)
 Bone (disambiguation)